Wildwood, Virginia may refer to:
Wildwood, Roanoke, Virginia
Wildwood, Fluvanna County, Virginia